is a song by Japanese rock band Asian Kung-Fu Generation. It was released as the fourth and final single of their second full-length studio album, Sol-fa, on September 23, 2004.

Music video
The music video for "Kimi no Machi Made" was directed by Daisuke Shibata. The PV revolves around a synchronised swimming duo at a competition performing their routine to the rhythm of the song. Despite the great amount of pressure on their shoulders as well as the interference of a giant crayfish, the two are able to successfully execute their routine. The video was nominated for Best Rock Video and Best Group Video at 2005 MTV Video Music Awards Japan. The video won the award for Best Concept Video at the 2005 SPACE SHOWER Music Video Awards.

Track listing

Personnel
Masafumi Gotō – lead vocals, rhythm guitar
Kensuke Kita – lead guitar, background vocals
Takahiro Yamada –  bass, background vocals
Kiyoshi Ijichi – drums
Asian Kung-Fu Generation – producer
Tohru Takayama – mixing, recording
Mitsuharu Harada – mastering
Kenichi Nakamura – recording
Kenichi Yamura – recording 
Yusuke Nakamura – single cover art

Charts

External links

References

Asian Kung-Fu Generation songs
2004 singles
Songs written by Masafumi Gotoh
2004 songs
Ki/oon Music singles